The 2021 All-Big 12 Conference football team consists of American football players chosen as All-Big 12 Conference players for the 2021 Big 12 Conference football season.  The conference recognizes two official All-Big 12 selectors: (1) the Big 12 conference coaches selected separate offensive and defensive units and named first- and second-team players (the "Coaches" team); and (2) a panel of sports writers and broadcasters covering the Big 12 also selected offensive and defensive units and named first- and second-team players (the "Media" team).

Offensive selections

Quarterbacks

 Spencer Sanders, Oklahoma State (Coaches-1)
 Brock Purdy, Iowa State (Coaches-2; Media-1)
 Caleb Williams, Oklahoma (Media-2)

Running backs

 Breece Hall, Iowa State (Coaches-1; Media-1)
 Bijan Robinson, Texas (Coaches-1; Media-1)
 Abram Smith, Baylor (Coaches-2; Media-2)
 Deuce Vaughn, Kansas State (Coaches-2; Media-2)

Fullbacks

 Jeremiah Hall, Oklahoma (Coaches-1)
 Jared Rus, Iowa State (Coaches-1)
 Jax Dineen, Kansas State (Coaches-2)

Centers

 Steve Avila, TCU (Coaches-2; Media-1)
 Collin Newell, Iowa State (Coaches-2)
 Jacob Gall, Baylor (Media-2)
 Dawson Deaton, Texas Tech (Coaches-2)
 Zach Frazier, West Virginia (Coaches-2)

Guards

 Josh Sills, Oklahoma State (Coaches-1; Media-1)
 Trevor Downing, Iowa State (Coaches-1; Media-1)
 Marquis Hayes, Oklahoma (Coaches-2; Media-2)
 Chris Murray, Oklahoma (Media-2)

Tackles

 Cooper Beebe, Kansas State (Coaches-1; Media-1)
 Connor Galvin, Baylor (Coaches-1; Media-1)
 Derek Kerstetter, Texas (Coaches-1; Media-2)
 Tyrese Robinson, Oklahoma (Media-2)

Tight ends

 Charlie Kolar, Iowa State (Coaches-1; Media-1)
 Chase Allen, Iowa State (Coaches-2)
 Jeremiah Hall, Oklahoma (Media-2)

Receivers

 Xavier Hutchinson, Iowa State  (Coaches-1; Media-1)
 Xavier Worthy, Texas (Coaches-1; Media-1)
 Quentin Johnston, TCU (Coaches-1)
 Tay Martin, Oklahoma State (Coaches-2; Media-2)
 Tyquan Thornton, Baylor (Coaches-2; Media-2)
 Erik Ezukanma, Texas Tech (Coaches-2)

Defensive selections

Defensive linemen
 Felix Anudike-Uzomah, Kansas State (Coaches-1; Media-1)
 Will McDonald IV, Iowa State (Coaches-1; Media-1)
 Dante Stills, West Virginia (Coaches-1; Media-1)
 Brock Martin, Oklahoma State (Coaches-1; Media-2)
 Eyioma Uwazurike, Iowa State (Coaches-1; Media-2)
 Siaki Ika, Baylor (Coaches-2; Media-1)
 Perrion Winfrey, Oklahoma (Coaches-2; Media-2)
 Collin Oliver, Oklahoma State (Coaches-2; Media-2)
 Kyron Johnson, Kansas (Coaches-2)
 Ochaun Mathis, TCU (Coaches-2)
 Isaiah Thomas, Oklahoma (Coaches-2)

Linebackers

 Terrel Bernard, Baylor (Coaches-1; Media-1)
 Malcolm Rodriguez, Oklahoma State (Coaches-1; Media-1)
 Mike Rose, Iowa State (Coaches-1; Media-1)
 Brian Asamoah, Oklahoma (Coaches-2; Media-2)
 Nik Bonitto, Oklahoma (Coaches-2; Media-2)
 Colin Schooler, Texas Tech (Coaches-2; Media-2)

Defensive backs

 Jarrick Bernard-Converse, Oklahoma State (Coaches-1; Media-1)
 Kolby Harvell-Peel, Oklahoma State (Coaches-1; Media-1)
 Tre'Vius Hodges-Tomlinson, TCU (Coaches-1; Media-1)
 Jalen Pitre, Baylor (Coaches-1; Media-1)
 Russ Yeast, Kansas State (Coaches-1; Media-2)
 DaMarcus Fields, Texas Tech (Coaches-2; Media-2)
 Christian Holmes, Oklahoma State (Coaches-2; Media-2)
 Kenny Logan Jr., Kansas (Coaches-2; Media-2)
 Delarrin Turner-Yell, Oklahoma (Coaches-2)
 Isheem Young, Iowa State (Coaches-2)

Special teams

Kickers

 Jonathan Garibay, Texas Tech (Coaches-1; Media-1)
 Gabe Brkic, Oklahoma (Coaches-2; Media-2)

Punters

 Michael Turk, Oklahoma (Coaches-1; Media-1)
 Cameron Dicker, Texas (Coaches-1)
 Austin McNamara, Texas Tech (Coaches-2; Media-2)

All-purpose / Return specialists

 Trestan Ebner, Baylor (Coaches-1; Media-1)
 Malik Knowles, Kansas State (Coaches-1; Media-2)
 Derrius Davis, TCU (Coaches-2;
 Brennan Pressley, Oklahoma State (Coaches-2;

Key
Bold = selected as a first-team player by both the coaches and media panel

Coaches = selected by Big 12 Conference coaches

Media = selected by a media panel

See also
2021 College Football All-America Team

References

All-Big 12 Conference
All-Big 12 Conference football teams